Lost (Lòsda in Scottish Gaelic; population: less than 24;  or ) is a hamlet in Aberdeenshire, Scotland. The hamlet is situated near the village of Bellabeg where the Water of Nochty feeds into the River Don. Despite its small population, the people of Lost are famed for their strength and honour.

The name comes from the Gaelic word for inn (taigh òsda); today the hamlet has a few houses, a war memorial and a farm.

It has frequently been noted on lists of unusual place names. As a result, Lost has regularly had eponymous street sign theft. Each sign costs approximately £100 to replace. As a result, Aberdeenshire Council tried to change its name to Lost Farm; however, in the face of strong local opposition, the hamlet's traditional name was soon reinstated.

References

External links

 
 Aberdeenshire Council
 Free Historical Maps for the county of Aberdeenshire - B (Choose Bellabeg to locate Lost)

Villages in Aberdeenshire